Ian Hindmarsh (born 31 March 1977) is an Australian former professional rugby league footballer who played in the 1990s and 2000s. Hindmarsh attended renowned rugby league school Fairfield Patrician Brothers College. A Country New South Wales representative forward, he played his club football in the National Rugby League for Australian clubs Parramatta Eels and Canberra Raiders as well as in the Super League for French club the   Catalans Dragons.

Background
Hindmarsh was born in Bowral, New South Wales, Australia.

Playing career
Hindmarsh started his career with Parramatta Eels and made his first grade debut for the club in Round 10 1999 against the Auckland Warriors in which Hindmarsh scored a try during a 28-6 victory.

In 2000, Hindmarsh played 19 games including the club's 16-10 loss against the Brisbane Broncos.  In 2001, Hindmarsh played 28 games including the club's 2001 NRL grand final loss to the Newcastle Knights. 

Salary cap restrictions forced the Parramatta Eels to release him and he signed with the Canberra Raiders. Hindmarsh played three seasons with the Canberra Raiders before signing on with the Catalans Dragons of the Super League. In his last season with Parramatta and in the top grade, Hindmarsh played 24 games as the club finished 5th. Hindmarsh's final game was Parramatta's preliminary final defeat against Melbourne at Docklands Stadium.

Post playing
At the end of the 2007 season, Hindmarsh retired from professional football to work full-time on the family dairy farm.

References

External links
Parramatta Eels profile

1977 births
Living people
Australian people of Scottish descent
Australian rugby league players
Canberra Raiders players
Catalans Dragons players
Country New South Wales Origin rugby league team players
Parramatta Eels players
People from Bowral
Rugby league locks
Rugby league second-rows
Rugby league players from New South Wales